The 2015 Indonesia Super Series Premier was the sixth Super Series tournament of the 2015 BWF Super Series. The tournament took place in Jakarta, Indonesia from 2–7 June 2015 with a total purse of $800,000.

Men's singles

Seeds

Top half

Bottom half

Finals

Women's singles

Seeds

Top half

Bottom half

Finals

Men's doubles

Seeds

Top half

Bottom half

Finals

Women's doubles

Seeds

Top half

Bottom half

Finals

Mixed doubles

Seeds

Top half

Bottom half

Finals

References 

Indonesia Open (badminton)
Indonesia
2015 in Indonesian sport
Sports competitions in Jakarta
June 2015 sports events in Asia